Across the Wide Missouri may refer to:
 Across the Wide Missouri (book), a 1947 book by Bernard DeVoto
 Across the Wide Missouri (film), a 1951 American film based on the book
"Oh Shenandoah" or "Across the Wide Missouri", a traditional American folk song